Störmeder Bach is a river of North Rhine-Westphalia, Germany.

It springs east of Geseke and south of Störmede (a district of Geseke). It is the left headstream of the Brandenbaumer Bach.

See also
List of rivers of North Rhine-Westphalia

References

Rivers of North Rhine-Westphalia
Rivers of Germany